Jorge Bruno Abarca Riveros (born 8 January 1967) is a Chilean biologist who was elected as a member of the Chilean Constitutional Convention.

See also
 List of members of the Chilean Constitutional Convention

References

External links
 BCN Profile
 

Living people
1967 births
21st-century Chilean politicians
Pontifical Catholic University of Valparaíso alumni
Members of the Chilean Constitutional Convention
People from Arica